A Petersburg Night is a 1934 Soviet drama film directed by Grigori Roshal and Vera Stroyeva.

Plot 
The film tells about the gifted musician Yegor Efimov, who goes to the capital Petersburg with the hope of succeeding in art, but once there, he realizes that it is not so easy.

Starring 
 Lyubov Orlova as Grushen'ka
 Boris Dobronravov as Musician Egor Efimov
 Kseniya Tarasova as Nastenka
 Anatoliy Goryunov as Schults
 Lev Fenin as Landlord
 Igor Doronin as Student
 Ivan Kudryavtsev as Vasilyev 
 Sergei Vecheslov 
 Antonin Pankryshev  
 Leonid Yurenev

References

External links 

 

1934 films
1930s Russian-language films
Soviet drama films
Soviet black-and-white films
1934 drama films